This is a list of German television related events from 1982.

Events
20 March - Nicole is selected to represent Germany at the 1982 Eurovision Song Contest with her song "Ein bißchen Frieden". She is selected to be the twenty-seventh German Eurovision entry during Ein Lied für Harrogate held at the BR Studios in Munich.
24 April - Germany wins the 27th Eurovision Song Contest in Harrogate, United Kingdom. The winning song is "Ein bißchen Frieden" performed by Nicole.

Debuts

Domestic
January - Einfach Lamprecht (1982) (ARD)
24 January - The Confessions of Felix Krull (1982) (ZDF)
19 April - Ein Stück Himmel (1982) (ARD)
12 May - Schwarz Rot Gold (1982–1996) (ARD)
12 July - Blood and Honor: Youth Under Hitler (1982) (ARD)
24 September - Meister Eder und sein Pumuckl (1982–1989) (ARD)
25 December - Jack Holborn (1982) (ZDF)

Television shows

1950s
Tagesschau (1952–present)

1960s
 heute (1963-present)

1970s
 heute-journal (1978-present)
 Tagesthemen (1978-present)

1980s
Wetten, dass..? (1981-2014)

Ending this year
22 November - Disco (1971-1982)

Births

Deaths